The Kyrgyz passport is issued to citizens of Kyrgyzstan for international travel.

Appearance 
The passport of a citizen of the Kyrgyz Republic contains 32 pages, not including the cover. The inside pages of the passport have a light blue background. The inscriptions in the passport are in blue and black.
The passport cover is light blue and is made of abrasion-resistant material. On the outside of the front cover there are gold-coloured printed inscriptions in the state, official and English languages:"КЫРГЫЗ РЕСПУБЛИКАСЫ КЫРГЫЗСКАЯ РЕСПУБЛИКА THE KYRGYZ REPUBLIC" . In the centre is an embossed image of the State Coat of Arms of the Kyrgyz Republic. Below the State Emblem is an embossed inscription in the state, official and English languages: "ПАСПОРТ ПАСПОРТ PASSPORT".

Identity page 
The identity page of the Kyrgyzstani passport  includes the following data:
 Photograph of the holder (4x6 cm; Distance from the bottom of chin to the eye line: 18mm; Distance from the top of the photo to the top of the hair: 5mm)
 Type 
 Country code 
 Passport number
 Name of the holder
 First names of the holder
 Place of birth of the holder
 Date of birth of the holder
 Sex of the holder
 Profession of the holder
 Place of issue of passport
 Date of issue of passport
 Date of expiry of the passport

Visa requirements

In 2016, Kyrgyzstani citizens had visa-free or visa on arrival access to 58 countries and territories, ranking the Kyrgyzstani passport 79th in the world according to the Visa Restrictions Index. A travel blogger from Kyrgyzstan shared the first-hand experience of challenges faced travelling with a Kyrgyzstani passport.

See also
Visa policy of Kyrgyzstan
Visa requirements for Kyrgyzstani citizens

References

External links

Kyrgyzstan
Government of Kyrgyzstan
Law of Kyrgyzstan